Barbora Krejčíková and Kateřina Siniaková defeated Eri Hozumi and Makoto Ninomiya in the final, 6–3, 6–3 to win the women's doubles tennis title at the 2018 French Open. It was their first major title together.

Bethanie Mattek-Sands and Lucie Šafářová were the defending champions, but did not compete together this year. Mattek-Sands partnered Latisha Chan, but was defeated in the second round by Irina Bara and Mihaela Buzărnescu. Šafářová partnered Svetlana Kuznetsova, but was defeated in the second round by Sorana Cîrstea and Sara Sorribes Tormo.

Despite losing in the first round with different partners, Ekaterina Makarova and Elena Vesnina jointly attained the world No. 1 doubles ranking at the end of the tournament. Chan and Tímea Babos were also in contention for the top ranking.

Seeds

Draw

Finals

Top half

Section 1

Section 2

Bottom half

Section 3

Section 4

References

External links
2018 French Open – Women's draws and results at the International Tennis Federation

Women's Doubles
2018 WTA Tour
2018